Thomas Mark "Tommy, The Bomber" Williams (April 17, 1940 – February 8, 1992) was an American professional ice hockey player.  A good skater and shooter, he received his nickname due to an incident in the early 1970s when he joked with Toronto customs officials that his bag contained a bomb (he was suspended for one game by the NHL as punishment). During most of the 1960s, Williams was the first regular American player in the NHL.

Amateur career
Born in Duluth, Minnesota, Williams was a member of the U.S. Olympic hockey team that defeated Czechoslovakia and won the Gold Medal at the 1960 Winter Olympics in Squaw Valley. He scored one goal and had four assists while playing on the second line with Bill Christian and Roger Christian.

Professional career
His National Hockey League career began when he joined the Boston Bruins for the 1961–62 NHL season. After eight seasons with the Bruins (and a serious injury in 1968 that almost ended his career) he joined the Minnesota North Stars, where he played for a season and a half until he was traded to the California Golden Seals.

After just two seasons with the Golden Seals, Williams jumped to the World Hockey Association (WHA) to play for the New England Whalers.  Upon his return to the NHL he joined the new expansion team Washington Capitals, led the team in scoring (22 goals, 36 assists) and was awarded the franchise's first penalty shot on December 5, 1974, against the Buffalo Sabres. He retired during the 1975–76 NHL season.

He and younger brother Butch Williams were the first American brothers to play in the NHL.

Post-career
In 1981, Williams was inducted into the United States Hockey Hall of Fame.

He made an appearance on the American gameshow I've Got a Secret, in which his secret was (at the time, in early 1966) that he was the only American-born player in major professional hockey.

Personal life
Williams' life was marred by personal tragedies that also had a negative impact on his playing career. In November 1970 his wife was found dead in a car; it was never determined for certain whether her death was due to accident or suicide. Normally a happy-go-lucky free spirit, he became moody and fought with North Stars manager Jack Gordon, who suspended him before trading him to the Seals. After he had retired from hockey, remarried and found a new career, his 23-year-old son Robert (a Boston Bruins prospect) died in 1987. Williams himself died of a heart attack in Hudson, Massachusetts on February 8, 1992, at the age of 51.

Career statistics

Regular season and playoffs

International

References

External links

ESPN Classic - The First Miracle On Ice

1940 births
1992 deaths
American men's ice hockey right wingers
Boston Braves (AHL) players
Boston Bruins players
California Golden Seals players
Ice hockey people from Duluth, Minnesota
Ice hockey players at the 1960 Winter Olympics
Medalists at the 1960 Winter Olympics
Minnesota North Stars players
New England Whalers players
New Haven Nighthawks players
Olympic gold medalists for the United States in ice hockey
United States Hockey Hall of Fame inductees
Washington Capitals players